The 1972 California Angels season involved the Angels finishing 5th in the American League West with a record of 75 wins and 80 losses.

Offseason
 October 27, 1971: Tony González was released by the Angels.
 December 10, 1971: Jim Fregosi was traded by the Angels to the New York Mets for Nolan Ryan, Don Rose, Leroy Stanton, and Frank Estrada.
 January 26, 1972: Tommie Reynolds was traded by the Angels to the Milwaukee Brewers for Andy Kosco.

Regular season
 April 18, 1972: Nolan Ryan struck out Charlie Manuel for the 500th strikeout of his career.

Opening Day starters
Sandy Alomar Sr.
Leo Cárdenas
Ken McMullen
Andy Messersmith
Vada Pinson
Mickey Rivers
Jim Spencer
Leroy Stanton
Jeff Torborg

Season standings

Record vs. opponents

Notable transactions
 May 2, 1972: Billy Cowan was released by the Angels.
 May 16, 1972: Steve Barber was signed as a free agent by the Angels.
 May 26, 1972: Archie Reynolds was traded by the Angels to the Milwaukee Brewers for Curt Motton.
 July 28, 1972: Joe Azcue and Syd O'Brien were traded by the Angels to the Milwaukee Brewers for Ron Clark and Paul Ratliff.
 August 1, 1972: Fred Kuhaulua was signed as an amateur free agent by the Angels.
 August 15, 1972: Andy Kosco was traded by the Angels to the Boston Red Sox for Chris Coletta.
 August 17, 1972: Eddie Fisher was traded by the California Angels to the Chicago White Sox for a player to be named later and Bruce Miller. The Chicago White Sox sent Bruce Kimm (September 1, 1972) to the California Angels to complete the trade.

Roster

Player stats

Batting

Starters by position
Note: Pos = Position; G = Games played; AB = At bats; H = Hits; Avg. = Batting average; HR = Home runs; RBI = Runs batted in

Other batters
Note: G = Games played; AB = At bats; H = Hits; Avg. = Batting average; HR = Home runs; RBI = Runs batted in

Pitching

Starting pitchers
Note: G = Games pitched; IP = Innings pitched; W = Wins; L = Losses; ERA = Earned run average; SO = Strikeouts

Other pitchers
Note: G = Games pitched; IP = Innings pitched; W = Wins; L = Losses; ERA = Earned run average; SO = Strikeouts

Relief pitchers
Note: G = Games pitched; W = Wins; L = Losses; SV = Saves; ERA = Earned run average; SO = Strikeouts

Farm system

Notes

References

1972 California Angels team page at Baseball Reference
1972 California Angels team page at www.baseball-almanac.com

Los Angeles Angels seasons
California Angels season
Los